Pasi Kuivalainen (born July 15, 1972 in Kuopio, Finland) is a retired professional ice hockey player who played in the SM-liiga. He played for KalPa, Porin Ässät, Ilves, Pelicans and Tappara.

External links

1972 births
Living people
Ässät players
Finnish ice hockey goaltenders
Ice hockey players with retired numbers
Ilves players
KalPa players
Lahti Pelicans players
People from Kuopio
Tappara players
Sportspeople from North Savo
20th-century Finnish people